Kart Zani (also Romanized as Kart Zanī; also known as Kūrt Zanī) is a village in Dar Pahn Rural District, Senderk District, Minab County, Hormozgan Province, Iran. At the 2006 census, its population was 148, in 29 families.

References 

Populated places in Minab County